Caterson is a surname. Notable people with the surname include:

 Dale Caterson (born 1961), Australian rower
 Fred Caterson (1919–2000), Australian politician

See also
 Catterson